Minerva Foundation Institute for Medical Research is a private research institute, funded and maintained by the Minerva Foundation.  The Minerva Foundation was founded in 1959.  The research institute is located in Meilahti at Biomedicum Helsinki Finland, in a large conglomerate of modern laboratories with research groups in the biomedical and medical research fields. The institute features seven research groups with about 40 employees.

Research groups 
Cardiovascular disease in the young research group, principal investigator: adjunct professor Taisto Sarkola
 Cellular neuroscience research group, principal investigator: adjunct professor Pirta Hotulainen
 Cardiovascular research group, principal investigator: adjunct professor Päivi Lakkisto
 Endocrinology research group, principal investigator: professor Hannele Yki-Järvinen
 Metabolism research group, principal investigator: adjunct professor Heikki Koistinen
 Lipid signaling and homeostasis research group, principal investigator (and director of the institute): professor Vesa Olkkonen
Membrane biology research group, principal investigator: professor Elina Ikonen
Associated group: Neuronal signaling research group, principal investigator: professor Dan Lindholm

References

External links 
Minerva Foundation Institute for Medical Research Home Page
Minerva Foundation Home Page

1959 establishments in Finland
Meilahti
Organisations based in Helsinki
Research institutes established in 1959
Medical research institutes in Finland